The Rewind Tour was the twelfth headlining concert tour by American country music trio Rascal Flatts, in support of their ninth studio album Rewind (2014). The tour began on May 16, 2014 in Maryland Heights, Missouri and ended on March 14, 2015 in Las Vegas, Nevada.

Opening acts
Sheryl Crow
Gloriana
Kellie Pickler
The Swon Brothers

Setlist
Average setlist for the tour:
"Payback"
"Why Wait"
"Here Comes Goodbye"
"Rewind"
"These Days"
"Stand"
"Fast Cars and Freedom"
"Bless the Broken Road"
"Banjo"
"Love You Out Loud"
"Happy" 
"My Wish"
"Summer Nights"
Medley: "DJ Tonight"/"Hot in Here"/"Here's to You"
"Life Is a Highway"
Encore
"Kickstart My Heart" 
"Me and My Gang"

Tour dates

notes
 This concert is a part of the Winstock Country Music Festival.
 This concert is a part of Dauphin's Country Festival. 
 This concert is a part of the Carnival Live Concert Series

Canceled shows

Box office score data

References

External links

2014 concert tours
Rascal Flatts concert tours